RuPaul's Drag Race All Stars is an American reality competition spin off edition of the original RuPaul's Drag Race, which is produced by World of Wonder, for Logo TV and later VH1. The show premiered on October 22, 2012, on Logo TV, before relocating to VH1. However, it was announced on February 20, 2020, on the show's official Twitter account that the fifth season would premiere on June 5, 2020, on Showtime. Following the cast announcement on May 8, 2020, producers announced that the show would remain airing on VH1 instead of Showtime due to the COVID-19 pandemic which caused "various scheduling and programming adjustments". On February 24, 2021, Paramount+ announced via Twitter that the streaming service would be the new home to the series for the sixth season.

The show documents RuPaul inviting past queens that proved themselves to have had the most successful careers once leaving the original show. Like the original show, RuPaul plays the role of host, mentor, and head judge for this series, as contestants are given different challenges each week. RuPaul's Drag Race employs a panel of judges, currently including RuPaul, Michelle Visage, Carson Kressley and Ross Mathews and a host of other guest judges, who critique contestants' progress throughout the competition. In seasons 1-6 the winner of RuPaul's Drag Race All Stars was awarded $100,000 and a spot in the Drag Race Hall of Fame. In season 7, due to the cast consisting of previous winners of the franchise, the winner was awarded $200,000 and crowned as "Queen of All Queens". 

The format of the seasons varies. For the first season, the queens had to compete in teams of two, pairing up with another fellow All Star. From the second through the sixth season, the queens decided on eliminations instead of the judges. In the seventh season, queens were not eliminated and instead competed to win Legendary Legend Stars, which were awarded to the winners of each challenge.

Format 

For the most part, the format of the All Star Drag Race resembles that of the main series - with each episode consisting of a mini-challenge (the winner of which earns an advantage in the maxi challenge), the maxi challenge (which determines who is eligible for elimination), and a lip-sync (which determines who is eliminated). However, each cast is composed of former contestants from the main series and the format for the competition is altered. For example, in seasons 2-6 the power over eliminations rested with the contestants themselves, who decided between the worst-performing contestants as deemed by the judges.

Format Variation 
The main difference in format to the main series are as follow:

 Season 1:  The first All-Stars season was a pairs competition. Queens competed in teams of two, determined by the contestants themselves. Both members of the losing team would be eliminated each week. The bottom two teams chose one member to "lip-synch for their lives". The non-lip synching teammates had the option during the first minute of the performance to declare a "she-mergency", hit a panic button, and "tag in" to complete the performance. In the finale, two pairs remained, at which point the pairs were disbanded.
 Seasons 2–4: The second season was an individual format much like the main series and introduced the format of having the contestants eliminating each other. This season also introduced the lip-sync for your legacy, where the top two contestants in each main challenge would compete in the lip-sync. The victor is awarded a cash prize of $10,000 and the power to eliminate any of the worst-performing queens from the main challenge. This format returned in the third and fourth seasons as well.
 Seasons 5-6: The fifth season made a minor adjustment to the format from seasons 2–4.  Only the sole main challenge winner can lip sync for her legacy against a Lip Sync Assassin (a notable contestant from a previous season), while the bottom 2/3 contestants are the only ones eligible for elimination. If the Assassin wins, the eliminated queen will be determined by a vote by the rest of the contestants. The $10,000 lip sync prize jackpot rolls over to further episodes until an All-Star queen wins a lip-sync. If the competing All-Star wins the lip sync, she will get the power to eliminate a fellow queen, as well as win a jackpotting cash prize. This format returned in the sixth season.
 Season 7: The seventh season features past winners from the franchise returning to compete and no contestants are eliminated prior to the final stage of the competition. The top two queens in each main challenge are awarded a "Legendary Legend Star" and compete in a lip-sync for the win. The winner of the lip-sync receives a $10,000 cash prize and the ability to block one of the six safe queens from receiving a star the following week. The contestants with the most stars at the end of the competition will participate in a lip-sync smackdown for the title "Queen of All Queens".

Judging

Untucked! 
Just like RuPaul's Drag Race, episodes of the first season of All Stars were followed by an Untucked! episode each week, giving the viewers a glimpse into the backstage drama and discussions between the returning contestants. For the second, third, and fourth seasons, the contestants deliberated among themselves in the workroom on who each of the top 2 would eliminate if they won the Lip Sync for Your Legacy. This served as a mini-Untucked! as there were no separately filmed Untucked companion episodes for those seasons. On June 5, 2020, it was announced that the aftershow series would return for the fifth season.

Series overview

Season 1 (2012) 

RuPaul's Drag Race: All Stars is the first All-Star season of RuPaul's Drag Race and premiered on the Logo network on October 22, 2012. Cast members were announced on August 6, 2012. The queens that were invited back to compete were: Alexis Mateo, Chad Michaels, Jujubee, Latrice Royale, Manila Luzon, Mimi Imfurst, Nina Flowers, Pandora Boxx, Raven, Shannel, Tammie Brown and Yara Sofia. The season featured these twelve returning contestants from seasons one to four, for a chance to be inducted into the "Drag Race Hall of Fame". It is the only season of All Stars to have the contestants compete in teams of two. This series consists of six episodes, each aired in a 60-minute time-slot. Contestants were judged on their "charisma, uniqueness, nerve and talent" and, since they competed in teams of two, also "synergy". The winner received a supply of MAC cosmetics, a "one of a kind trip" and $100,000.

In each episode, the judges provide their critiques on the contestants' performances in the main challenge and on the runway before RuPaul announces which team is the winner and which teams had the weakest performances. The teams deemed as being the bottom two must "lip sync for their lives" and choose a queen to represent their team in the lip sync in a final attempt to impress RuPaul. After the lip sync, RuPaul decides who stays and who leaves. RuPaul describes the qualities the contestants must have to be crowned the winner of the show as "Charisma, Uniqueness, Nerve, and Talent... These are people who have taken adversity and turned it into something that is beautiful and something powerful." The phrase "charisma, uniqueness, nerve, and talent" is used repeatedly on the show, the acronym of which is CUNT. On the All Stars season, "synergy" was added to provide an explanation behind the contestants being sorted into teams (expanding the acronym into CUNTS). The winner was Chad Michaels, while Raven placed as the runner-up, again.

Season 2 (2016) 

A second season of All Stars was announced in 2015 and started shooting immediately after season 8. The show was to begin airing on August 25, 2016. Along with the season premiere's announcement, the cast of All Stars 2 were revealed. The cast consisted of 10 returning contestants, Adore Delano, Alaska, Alyssa Edwards, Coco Montrese, Detox, Ginger Minj, Katya, Phi Phi O'Hara, Roxxxy Andrews, and Tatianna. A new twist was revealed for this season changing the format of the show. In previous seasons, the two lowest performing queens had to "Lip Sync for their Life" to avoid elimination. This season has the two best-performing queens of the challenge "Lip Sync for their Legacy", with the winner of the lip sync earning $10,000 and choosing which one of the bottom queens to eliminate. However, on their exit, RuPaul advised the first four eliminated queens that they will have the opportunity to come back for their "revenge", with the winner gaining entry back into the competition.

This season featured a lip-sync to the Rihanna song 'Shut Up and Drive' by Alyssa Edwards and Tatianna that has frequently been rated the number one best Drag Race lip-sync performance. The winner was Alaska, while Detox and Katya placed as the runners-up.

Season 3 (2018) 

On August 21, 2017, VH1 announced it would air a third season of the series in early 2018. On October 13, 2017, VH1 announced that a one-hour special, RuPaul's Drag Race All Stars Exclusive Queen RuVeal, would air on October 20, 2017, announcing the season's returning contestants. The contestants competing on the third season of All Stars were Aja, BenDeLaCreme, Chi Chi DeVayne, Kennedy Davenport, Milk, Morgan McMichaels, Shangela, Thorgy Thor, and Trixie Mattel. Season one winner BeBe Zahara Benet was announced as the surprise tenth contestant. On December 14, 2017, it was announced that the third season would premiere on January 25, 2018. A new twist on how the top queens of the season were to be chosen was revealed in the season's final episode. The previously eliminated queens returned in the finale and voted for the top two out of the remaining top four finalists. The two queens with the most votes advanced while the others were eliminated. The winner was Trixie Mattel; Kennedy Davenport was the runner-up.

Season 4 (2018–2019)

In August 2018, during an episode of his podcast, Whats the Tee?, RuPaul confirmed he was filming the fourth season of All Stars. On August 22, 2018, VH1 officially announced a fourth season of All Stars, with the cast still yet to be revealed. On November 9, season 3 winner Trixie Mattel hosted a live stream with season 2 finalists Katya and Detox to announce the cast. The ten contestants competing on the fourth season of All Stars were Farrah Moan, Gia Gunn, Jasmine Masters, Latrice Royale, Manila Luzon, Monét X Change, Monique Heart, Naomi Smalls, Trinity the Tuck, and Valentina. Gia Gunn was the first transgender contestant to compete on a season of All Stars, while Latrice Royale and Manila Luzon were the first contestants to return after competing in a previous season of All Stars. The fourth season premiered on December 14, 2018, on VH1. The winners were Trinity the Tuck and Monét X Change; this marked the first and only double crowning to date in the Drag Race franchise.

Season 5 (2020) 

On August 19, 2019, it was announced that the series had been renewed for a fifth season. It was announced on February 20, 2020, on the show's official Twitter account, that the season would premiere on June 5, 2020, on Showtime. The cast was revealed on May 8, 2020. Following the cast announcement, producers announced that the show will air on VH1 instead of Showtime due to the COVID-19 pandemic which caused "various scheduling and programming adjustments." The ten contestants competing that season were Alexis Mateo, Blair St. Clair, Derrick Barry, India Ferrah, Jujubee, Mariah Paris Balenciaga, Mayhem Miller, Miz Cracker, Ongina, and Shea Couleé. The winner was Shea Couleé, leaving Jujubee and Miz Cracker as the runners-up.

Season 6 (2021) 

On August 20, 2020, VH1 renewed the series for its sixth season. On February 24, 2021, ViacomCBS announced that the sixth season of the show would move to Paramount+. On May 26, it was announced that the season would air beginning June 24, 2021. The season's thirteen contestants were A'keria C. Davenport, Eureka!, Ginger Minj, Jan, Jiggly Caliente, Kylie Sonique Love, Pandora Boxx, Ra'Jah O'Hara, Scarlet Envy, Serena ChaCha, Silky Nutmeg Ganache, Trinity K. Bonet, and Yara Sofia. The winner was Kylie Sonique Love, leaving Eureka!, Ginger Minj, and Ra'Jah O'Hara as runners-up. Kylie made history as the first transgender queen to win the crown on the American version of the show.

Season 7 (2022) 

The series was renewed for its seventh season on February 15, 2022, to be aired on Paramount+. The cast was announced on April 13, 2022. It included eight winners of past seasons returning to compete, making it the first season featuring only past winners.  It also became the first US season to feature a contestant from another franchise.  The cast consisted of four winners of Drag Race: Jaida Essence Hall (season 12), Jinkx Monsoon (season 5), Raja (season 3) and Yvie Oddly (season 11); three winners of All Stars: Monét X Change and Trinity the Tuck (co-winning season 4) and Shea Couleé (season 5); and the winner of UK season 1, The Vivienne.  Jinkx Monsoon was crowned the Queen of All Queens, becoming the first to win two seasons of RuPaul's Drag Race. Monét X Change was the runner-up and Raja won a second title, "Queen of 'She Done Already Done Had Herses'."

International adaptations 

 RuPaul's Drag Race: UK Vs the World (2022): On December 21, 2021, World of Wonder announced that a British All Stars adaptation series of RuPaul's Drag Race UK would premiere in February 2022. Filmed in the United Kingdom, the series features international queens who have competed in the Drag Race franchise around the world.
 Canada's Drag Race: Canada vs. the World (2022): An "international all-stars" season of the Drag Race franchise premiered via Crave and WOW Presents Plus in November 2022. The series is a spin-off of Canada's Drag Race and the second edition of the Drag Race franchise to feature queens from numerous international versions of the competition.
 Drag Race España All Stars (TBD): A spin-off of Drag Race España, it is the first international version of the All Stars format. It was announced in September 2022 and is scheduled to air following the forthcoming third season of Drag Race España.

Home media 

Starting in September 2019, the first two seasons became available to stream on Hulu. Seasons 1 through 3 became available to stream on CBS All Access on July 30, 2020, later on every new season became available on Paramount+. It also became available on WOW Presents Plus, except the United States.

Awards and nominations

Discography

References 

 
2012 American television series debuts
Logo TV original programming
VH1 original programming
2010s American reality television series
2020s American reality television series
2010s American LGBT-related television series
2020s American LGBT-related television series
American television spin-offs
Reality television spin-offs
Television series by World of Wonder (company)
Transgender-related television shows
American LGBT-related reality television series
Paramount+ original programming